The hazel (Corylus) is a genus of deciduous trees and large shrubs native to the temperate Northern Hemisphere. The genus is usually placed in the birch family Betulaceae, though some botanists split the hazels (with the hornbeams and allied genera) into a separate family Corylaceae. The fruit of the hazel is the hazelnut.

Hazels have simple, rounded leaves with double-serrate margins. The flowers are produced very early in spring before the leaves, and are monoecious, with single-sex catkins.

The shape and structure of the involucre, and also the growth habit (whether a tree or a suckering shrub), are important in the identification of the different species of hazel.

The pollen of hazel species, which are often the cause for allergies in late winter or early spring, can be identified under magnification (600×) by their characteristic granular exines bearing three conspicuous pores.

Species

Corylus has 14–18 species. The circumscription of species in eastern Asia is disputed, with WCSP and the Flora of China differing in which taxa are accepted; within this region, only those taxa accepted by both sources are listed below. The species are grouped as follows:
 Nut surrounded by a soft, leafy involucre, multiple-stemmed, suckering shrubs to 12 m tall
 Involucre short, about the same length as the nut
 Corylus americana – American hazel, eastern North America
 Corylus avellana – Common hazel, Europe and western Asia
 Corylus heterophylla – Asian hazel, Asia
 Corylus yunnanensis – Yunnan hazel, central and southern China
 Involucre long, twice the length of the nut or more, forming a 'beak'
 Corylus colchica – Colchican filbert, Caucasus
 Corylus cornuta – Beaked hazel, North America
 Corylus maxima – Filbert, southeastern Europe and southwest Asia
 Corylus sieboldiana – Asian beaked hazel, northeastern Asia and Japan (syn. C. mandshurica)
 Nut surrounded by a stiff, spiny involucre, single-stemmed trees to 20–35 m tall
 Involucre moderately spiny and also with glandular hairs
 Corylus chinensis – Chinese hazel, western China
 Corylus colurna – Turkish hazel, southeastern Europe and Asia Minor
 Corylus fargesii – Farges' hazel, western China
 Corylus jacquemontii – Jacquemont's hazel, Himalaya
 Corylus wangii – Wang's hazel, southwest China
 Involucre densely spiny, resembling a chestnut burr
 Corylus ferox – Himalayan hazel, Himalaya, Tibet and southwest China (syn. C. tibetica).

Several hybrids exist, and can occur between species in different sections of the genus, e.g. Corylus × colurnoides (C. avellana × C. colurna).  The oldest confirmed hazel species is Corylus johnsonii found as fossils in the Ypresian-age rocks of Ferry County, Washington.

Ecology 
At least 21 species of fungus have a mutualistic relationship with hazel. Lactarius pyrogalus grows almost exclusively on hazel, and hazel is one of two kinds of host for the rare Hypocreopsis rhododendri. Several rare species of Graphidion lichen depend on hazel trees. In the UK, five species of moth are specialised to feed on hazel including Parornix devoniella. Animals which eat hazelnuts include red deer, dormouse and red squirrel.

Uses 

The nuts of all hazels are edible. The common hazel is the species most extensively grown for its nuts, followed in importance by the filbert. Nuts are also harvested from the other species, but apart from the filbert, none is of significant commercial importance.

A number of cultivars of the common hazel and filbert are grown as ornamental plants in gardens, including forms with contorted stems (C. avellana 'Contorta', popularly known as "Corkscrew hazel" or "Harry Lauder's walking stick" from its gnarled appearance); with weeping branches (C. avellana 'Pendula'); and with purple leaves (C. maxima 'Purpurea').

Hazel is a traditional material used for making wattle, withy fencing, baskets, and the frames of coracle boats.  The tree can be coppiced, and regenerating shoots allow for harvests every few years.

Hazels are used as food plants by the larvae of various species of Lepidoptera.

Culture

The Celts believed hazelnuts gave one wisdom and inspiration. There are numerous variations on an ancient tale that nine hazel trees grew around a sacred pool, dropping into the water nuts that were eaten by salmon (a fish sacred to Druids), which absorbed the wisdom. A Druid teacher, in his bid to become omniscient, caught one of these special salmon and asked a student to cook the fish, but not to eat it. While he was cooking it, a blister formed and  the pupil used his thumb to burst it, which he naturally sucked to cool, thereby absorbing the fish's wisdom. This boy was called Fionn Mac Cumhail (Fin McCool) and went on to become one of the most heroic leaders in Gaelic mythology.

"The Hazel Branch" from Grimms' Fairy Tales claims that hazel branches offer the greatest protection from snakes and other things that creep on the earth. In the Grimm tale "Cinderella", a hazel branch is planted by the protagonist at her mother's grave and grows into a tree that is the site where the girl's wishes are granted by birds.

Gallery

References

External links

 

 
Edible nuts and seeds
Taxa named by Carl Linnaeus